The Forest Houses are a housing project in Morrisania, Bronx. The project consists of fifteen buildings, 9, 10 and 14-stories tall with 1,350 apartment units. It covers a 17.72-acre expanse, and is bordered by East 163rd and East 166th Streets, and Trinity and Tinton Avenues. It is owned and managed by New York City Housing Authority (NYCHA).

Development 
Plans for the Forest Houses began in 1949 with securing the funds from the federal government. NYCHA officials stated that the housing program is primarily a slum clearance program and they intend the finished development to provide better living conditions and a walkable community for the residents. During demolition of the slums, the area was likened to a "bomb blast scene" and held a defense test on the site. The development's design incorporated well-received modern features at the Carver Houses, including compact kitchens, electric ranges, and a refrigerator with freezer. NYCHA publicized that the tenants would be 58% Black and 42% non-Black, most of which were Puerto Rican. The Forest Houses were completed on November 12, 1956.

In 2013, Forest Houses residents worked with artist Thomas Hirschhorn to a space to encourage the exchange between people, ideas and communities in the form of a pavilion. Also that year, NYCHA and Mayor Bloomberg sold a portion of the development's property for the addition of a new privately owned building to offset the agency's capital needs. The eight-story LEED-certified building was designated for low-income households earning less than 60 percent of the area median income and cost approximately $37.7 million to build.

Notable residents 

 Diamond D (born 1968), producer
 Fat Joe (born 1970), rapper and actor
 Coko (born 1970),r&b singer
 Lord Finesse (born 1970), rapper and producer
 Showbiz, producer
 PHASE 2, graffiti writer

References

Development Map

1956 architecture
Public housing in the Bronx
Residential buildings in the Bronx
Morrisania, Bronx